{{Infobox writer 
| name        = Thomas McCarthy
| birth_date  = 1954
| birth_place = Cappoquin, County Waterford, Ireland
| nationality  = Irish
| alma_mater   = University College Cork
| occupation  = Poet, novelist
| notableworks = The Sorrow Garden, Mr Dineen's Careful Parade, "The Merchant Prince}}

Thomas McCarthy (born 1954) is an Irish poet, novelist, and critic, born in Cappoquin, County Waterford, Ireland. He attended University College Cork where he was part of a resurgence of literary activity under the inspiration of John Montague. Among McCarthy's contemporaries, described by Thomas Dillon Redshaw as "that remarkable generation", were the writers and poets Theo Dorgan, Sean Dunne, Greg Delanty, Maurice Riordan and William Wall. McCarthy edited, at various times, The Cork Review and Poetry Ireland Review. He has published seven collections of poetry with Anvil Press Poetry, London, including  The Sorrow Garden, The Lost Province, Mr Dineen's Careful Parade, The Last Geraldine Officer, and Merchant Prince. The main themes of his poetry are Southern Irish politics, love and memory. He is also the author of two novels;  Without Power and Asya and Christine. He is married with two children and lives in Cork City where he worked in the City Libraries until his retirement. He won the Patrick Kavanagh Poetry Award in 1977. His monograph "Rising from the Ashes" tells the story of the burning of the Carnegie Free Library in Cork City by the Black and Tans in 1920 and the subsequent efforts to rebuild the collection with the help of donors from all over the world.

Works

Poetry
 1978 in poetry: The First Convention, Dolmen Press, Dublin
 1981 in poetry: The Sorrow Garden, Anvil Press, London
 1984 in poetry: The Non-Aligned Storyteller, Anvil Press, London
 1989 in poetry: Seven Winters in Paris, Anvil Press, London
 1996 in poetry: The Lost Province, Anvil Press, London
 1999 in poetry: Mr Dineen’s Careful Parade: New and Selected Poems, Anvil Press, London
 2005 in poetry: Merchant Prince, Anvil Press, London
 2009 in poetry: The Last Geraldine Officer, Anvil Press, London

Fiction
 1990 in literature: Without Power, Poolbeg Press, Dublin
 1993 in literature: Asya and Christine, Poolbeg Press, Dublin

Nonfiction
 2021: Poetry, Memory and the Party, Gallery Press, Dublin
 1998: The Garden of Remembrances, New Island Books, Dublin

Other works
McCarthy is also a contributor to a series of podcasts made by Podcasts.ie (under the Arts Council of Ireland’s Literature Project Awards) called The Writer's Passage'' in which 10 Irish authors take a personal tour through the locations of their books.

Notes and references
Ryan, Ray. Ireland and Scotland: Literature and Culture, State and Nation, 1966–2000. Oxford University Press, 2002.

External links
Thomas McCarthy Poems in Qualm
 
 Podcast interview with Thomas McCarthy in which he reads from his work (March 2010)

Alumni of University College Cork
Irish poets
1954 births
Living people
People from County Waterford
Aosdána members
20th-century Irish writers
20th-century male writers
21st-century Irish writers
21st-century Irish male writers
International Writing Program alumni